Beets (Beta vulgaris) are used as a food plant by the larvae of several Lepidoptera species including:

Angle shades (Phlogophora meticulosa)
Cabbage moth (Mamestra brassicae)
Flame (Axylia putris)
Flame shoulder (Ochropleura plecta)
Garden dart (Euxoa nigricans)
Ghost moth (Hepialus humuli)
Heart and dart (Agrotis exclamationis)
Hypercompe indecisa
Large yellow underwing (Noctua pronuba)
Nutmeg (Discestra trifolii)
Setaceous Hebrew character (Xestia c-nigrum)
Turnip moth (Agrotis segetum)

External links

Beets